Ingvild Wetrhus Thorsvik (born 19 November 1991) is a Norwegian politician.

She was elected representative to the Storting from the constituency of Vest-Agder for the period 2021–2025, for the Liberal Party. She is member of the Preparatory Credentials Committee for the period 2021–2025.

References

1991 births
Living people
Liberal Party (Norway) politicians
Vest-Agder politicians
Members of the Storting
Women members of the Storting